The Roman Catholic Diocese of Warszawa-Praga is a diocese located in the east part of Warsaw (Praga) in the Ecclesiastical province of Warszawa in Poland.

According to the church statistics about 31,4% attended a church at least once a week and about 14,6% took communion regularly (once a week or more often) in 2013.

History
 March 25, 1992: Established as Diocese of Warszawa – Praga from the Diocese of Płock and Metropolitan Archdiocese of Warszawa
 May 24, 2008: Archbishop Henryk Hoser S.A.C., adjunct secretary of the Congregation for the Evangelisation of Peoples and president of the Pontifical Mission Societies, was appointed as bishop of Warszawa-Praga (area 3,300, population 1,113,000, Catholics 1,088,000, priests 650, religious 1,623), Poland. He conserves his personal title of archbishop.

Special churches
Minor Basilicas:
 Bazylika Najświętszego Serca Jezusowego in Praga (Sacred Heart)
 Bazylika Trójcy Przenajświętszej in Kobyłka (Holy Trinity)
 Bazylika Katedralna św. Michała Archanioła i św. Floriana Męczennika  (Cathedral Basilica of St. Michael the Archangel and St. Florian)

Leadership
 Bishops of Warszawa-Praga (Roman rite)
 Bishop Kazimierz Romaniuk (1992–2004)
 Archbishop Sławoj Leszek Głódź (2004–2008)
 Archbishop Henryk Hoser (2008-2017)
 Bishop Romuald Kamiński (since 2017)

Sex Abuse Reports
On September 27, 2018, Bishop Romuald Kamiński apologized for the history of sex abuse of minors in the Diocese. He also stated that work on a document addressing the Polish Catholic Church on the abuse of minors and suggesting ways to prevent it was completed. Archbishop Wojciech Polak, who serves as the Primate of Poland, also stated this document would also contain data on the sexual abuse committed by Catholic clergy in Poland. Statistics were released on 14 April 2019, commissioned by the Episcopal Conference of Poland and with data from over 10,000 local parishes. It was found that from 1990 to mid-2018, abuse reports about 382 priests were made to the Church, with 625 children, mostly under 16, sexually abused by members of the Catholic clergy. There were opinions that the figures underestimated the extent of the problem, and failed to answer questions church officials had avoided for years. Marek Lisinski, the co-founder of Don’t Be Afraid, which represents victims of clerical abuse, said "Tell us how [the priests] hurt those children and how many times they were transferred to different parishes before you paid notice". The data were released a few weeks after Pope Francis had called for "an all-out battle against the abuse of minors". After pressure from the Pope, in the preceding years Poland's church had publicly apologized to abuse victims, and accepted the need to report those accused of such crimes. In earlier times clergy to whom sexual abuse of minors was reported were not required by their superiors to notify the police, but to investigate themselves, and if necessary inform the Vatican.

See also
Roman Catholicism in Poland

Sources
 GCatholic.org
 Catholic Hierarchy
   Diocese website

References

Roman Catholic dioceses in Poland
Christian organizations established in 1992
Religion in Warsaw
Roman Catholic dioceses and prelatures established in the 20th century